Benjamín Roberto "Behn" H. Cervantes (August 25, 1938 – August 13, 2013) was a Filipino artist and activist. He was highly regarded as a theater pioneer, teacher, and progressive thinker who was detained multiple times during martial law in the Philippines.

He directed the film Sakada (1976), about the struggle of Negrense peasants at a sugarcane plantation. Copies of the film were seized by the military under the Marcos dictatorship. Musical scorer Lutgardo Labad described the film as "a major cinematic coup that unearthed the inhuman conditions of our people then." In 1981, the film won a Dekada Award for Best Film of the Decade.

At the University of the Philippines (UP), he founded the theater group UP Repertory Company in 1974 "to combat the censorship that was in place during martial law." He was also a member of the Upsilon Sigma Phi fraternity. He was also founding member of the Philippine Educational Theater Association (PETA) and the Manunuri ng Pelikulang Filipino.

Cervantes’ name is on the Bantayog ng mga Bayani Wall of Remembrance, which recognizes heroes who fought against martial law in the Philippines under Ferdinand E. Marcos.

Work on stage and in film

In theater 
Among Cervantes’ work as stage director are Guys and Dolls, The Short, Short Life of Citizen Juan, and Iskolar ng Bayan.

Cervantes appeared in many stage productions as actor, including The Mikado, Waiting for Godot, Rosencrantz and Guildenstern Are Dead, Cabaret, and M. Butterfly.

He also worked on activist plays, including Pagsambang Bayan and Estados Unidos versus Juan Matapang Cruz. He also directed Sigaw ng Bayan, which was about the Philippine Revolution.

In film 
Cervantes directed Sakada in 1976 while the Philippines was under martial law. The film about sugarcane plantation workers "was a thinly-veiled criticism of the country's feudal power structure." It starred Rosa Rosal, Robert Arevalo, Hilda Koronel, Alicia Alonzo, Pancho Magalona, Bembol Roco, Gloria Romero, and Tony Santos Sr. After the movie had spent three weeks in theaters, Marcos ordered the military to seize copies of the film. The film led to Cervantes' arrest. Sakada received its first screening on Philippine television in 2005.

He also directed Bawal, Ito Kaya’y Pagkakasala, and Masikip, Masakit, Mahapdi.

He appeared in the films Bomba Star, Aguila, When I Fall In Love, Memories of Old Manila, Waiting in the Wings, Alas-Dose, Ang Anak ni Brocka, and Barako.

Activism 
Cervantes took part in the 1984 Welcome Rotonda protest, during which pro-Marcos forces hosed down and fired tear gas at several thousand peaceful protesters gathered at Welcome Rotonda.

In 1985, Cervantes and fellow filmmaker Lino Brocka attended a nationwide transport strike in sympathy with public transportation drivers who organized the strike against rising gas prices. Cervantes and Brocka were arrested and charged with illegal assembly, which carries a penalty of life imprisonment. They were released after 16 days.

He was a member of the Concerned Artists of the Philippines.

Awards 

 Life Achievement Award from University of the Philippines Alumni Association
 Aliw award for Life Achievement in Theater
 Cultural Center of the Philippines' centennial award

See also 

 Bantayog ng mga Bayani

References 

1938 births
2013 deaths
Filipino film directors
Filipino activists
History of the Philippines (1965–1986)
Martial law under Ferdinand Marcos
Political repression in the Philippines
Presidency of Ferdinand Marcos
Individuals honored at the Bantayog ng mga Bayani
Marcos martial law victims
Artists and cultural workers honored at the Bantayog ng mga Bayani